Chiel Meijering (born 15 June 1954, in Amsterdam) is a Dutch composer. He studied composition with Ton de Leeuw, percussion with Jan Labordus and Jan Pustjens, and piano at the Conservatorium van Amsterdam.

Although his over 1,000 works are composed for conventional European classical instruments, Meijering has a fondness for outrageous titles.  Some examples include "I Hate Mozart" (for flute, alto saxophone, harp and violin); "I've Never Seen a Straight Banana" (for alto saxophone, marimba, piano, harp, and violin); "If the Camels Don't Get You, the Fatimas Must!" (for solo violin); and "Background-Music for Non-Entertainment Use in Order to Cover Unwanted Noise" (for four saxophones).

Between July 2016 and March 2018, Meijering composed 117 bassoon concertos and chamber concertos for bassoonist Kathleen McLean, Professor at the Jacobs School of Music, Indiana University, co-principal bassoon of the World Orchestra for Peace and former associate principal bassoon of the Toronto Symphony Orchestra. These works are in a one movement form, shifting styles within each piece with influences of folk, jazz, avant-garde, funk and classical. Many themes often come from his existing operatic scores and sketches. In addition to these, he also transcribed 55 recorder concertos written for Dan Laurin between 2012 and 2015 scored now for bassoon and string orchestra. These multi movement works could be described as encore pieces or concertinos. The later concertos are more complex in structure, rhythmically and technically demanding for both the bassoon and string orchestra. McLean assisted Meijering throughout this creative process by proofing and making editing suggestions, often he would ask her for assistance in titles and would request she write down a riff as a personal signature that he would incorporate and expand upon in some of these concertos. Meijering is often inspired by family roots, photographs, art, and daily events. Knowing of her Scottish background, one can hear Celtic melodies weaving throughout the scores as well as American folk, country, darker emotive moods and ribald humor pushing the boundaries technically and expressively for the instrument. Meijering's monumental contribution to the bassoon repertoire is extraordinary and it is proof that he considers the bassoon as a truly soloistic voice. In 2018, he also composed several new pieces for bassoon and piano available at Donemus Publishing.

On October 29, 2016, a recent commission "Whatever Lies Ahead" for 12 cellos was premiered in Amsterdam by the 12 Cellists of the Berlin Philharmonic with great success.

In 2017, McLean received a grant from FPK Holland for a new commission by Meijering for 12 bassoons and strings entitled "The Reed Which Bends in the Wind," to be premiered in Bloomington Indiana on March 31, 2018, and later in Granada, Spain at the International Double Reed Society Conference, August 29, 2018 with McLean and a group of celebrated international bassoon artists.

External links
 Chiel Meijering official site
 Chiel Meijering page at Donemus/MuziekGroup Nederland

1954 births
Living people
Dutch male classical composers
Dutch classical composers
20th-century classical composers
21st-century classical composers
Musicians from Amsterdam
Conservatorium van Amsterdam alumni
20th-century Dutch male musicians
21st-century male musicians